Probabilistic encryption is the use of randomness in an encryption algorithm, so that when encrypting the same message several times it will, in general, yield different ciphertexts.  The term "probabilistic encryption" is typically used in reference to public key encryption algorithms; however various symmetric key encryption algorithms achieve a similar property (e.g., block ciphers when used in a chaining mode such as CBC), and stream ciphers such as Freestyle which are inherently random.  To be semantically secure, that is, to hide even partial information about the plaintext, an encryption algorithm must be probabilistic.

History 

The first provably-secure probabilistic public-key encryption scheme was proposed by Shafi Goldwasser and Silvio Micali, based on the hardness of the quadratic residuosity problem and had a message expansion factor equal to the public key size.  More efficient probabilistic encryption algorithms include Elgamal, Paillier, and various constructions under the random oracle model, including OAEP.

Security 

Probabilistic encryption is particularly important when using public key cryptography.  Suppose that the adversary observes a ciphertext, and suspects that the plaintext is either "YES" or "NO", or has a hunch that the plaintext might be "ATTACK AT CALAIS". When a deterministic encryption algorithm is used, the adversary can simply try encrypting each of his guesses under the recipient's public key, and compare each result to the target ciphertext.  To combat this attack, public key encryption schemes must incorporate an element of randomness, ensuring that each plaintext maps into one of a large number of possible ciphertexts.

An intuitive approach to converting a deterministic encryption scheme into a probabilistic one is to simply pad the plaintext with a random string before encrypting with the deterministic algorithm.  Conversely, decryption involves applying a deterministic algorithm and ignoring the random padding.  However, early schemes which applied this naive approach were broken due to limitations in some deterministic encryption schemes.  Techniques such as Optimal Asymmetric Encryption Padding (OAEP) integrate random padding in a manner that is secure using any trapdoor permutation.

Examples 

Example of probabilistic encryption using any trapdoor permutation:

 x - single bit plaintext
 f - trapdoor permutation (deterministic encryption algorithm)
 b - hard core predicate of f
 r - random string

This is inefficient because only a single bit is encrypted. In other words, the message expansion factor is equal to the public key size.

Example of probabilistic encryption in the random oracle model:

 x - plaintext
 f - trapdoor permutation (deterministic encryption algorithm)
 h - random oracle (typically implemented using a publicly specified hash function)
 r - random string

See also
 Deterministic encryption
 Efficient Probabilistic Public-Key Encryption Scheme
 Strong secrecy

References

External links
 Shafi Goldwasser and Silvio Micali, Probabilistic Encryption, Special issue of Journal of Computer and Systems Sciences, Vol. 28, No. 2, pages 270-299, April 1984
Freestyle, a randomized version of ChaCha for resisting offline brute-force and dictionary attacks .

Theory of cryptography